Mississippi Highway 503 (MS 503) is a  state highway in eastern Mississippi running from MS 528 near its junction with Interstate 59 (I-59) outside of Heidelberg to MS 15 in Decatur. The highway has been in existence since 1951 and became designated MS 503 by 1955.

Route description
MS 503 begins in rural Jasper County at MS 528. The two-lane highway generally heads north through wooded areas passing a few residences and some small settlements. About  into its trip, state maintenance of MS 503 ends and county maintenance occurs for the next . The road ascends and descends small hills until it reaches the community of Paulding, one of two county seats of Jasper County. Some houses, churches, a post office, and a government building surround the community's center intersection at MS 503 and County Road 16 (CR 16). In Paulding, MS 503 briefly curves to the southwest before reaching the aforementioned intersection. Here, MS 503 turns north resuming state maintenance and its course through wooded lands. At MS 18, MS 503 has a short  concurrency with MS 18 adjacent to an electrical substation before continuing north.

As MS 503 heads north, the highway continues on a trek through wooded areas with some houses along the road. At the settlement of Hero, it intersects MS 504 at its eastern terminus. Soon after, MS 503 crosses into Newton County. The road enters the town on Jefferson Street, crosses a railroad, and passes by a few businesses. At U.S. Route 80 (US 80), MS 503 heads west along US 80 for one block before turning off the concurrency on Jackson Street. The state highway heads north-northwest out of town towards I-20. The highway interchanges I-20 at its exit 115, a diamond interchange. Nearing its end, MS 503 heads northwest approaching Decatur. Before entering the town, the highway passes a golf course and Newton County High School. The highway enters the town south of its central business district and is only surrounded by residences. It comes to an end at MS 15 at a simple T-intersection.

History
The state highway that traveled along MS 503's current alignment was created in 1951, but was an unnumbered unpaved road. By 1955, MS 503 was formally designated along most of its current alignment, but with a change in Jasper County. The segment from MS 528 and MS 18 was the same, however, another segment was designated between Rose Hill at MS 18 and Hero before resuming its northerly course towards Hickory and Decatur. The portion of current MS 503 between MS 18 and Hero was not designated a state highway at this time. Later, this portion of current MS 503 had been designated MS 507. By 1965, MS 503 and MS 507 had swapped alignments with MS 503 following a direct route from MS 18 to Hero and MS 507 following a road heading northwest from Rose Hill. The highway has followed this alignment since then.

Major intersections

References

External links

503
Transportation in Jasper County, Mississippi
Transportation in Newton County, Mississippi